Chaiturgarh or Lafagarh is a fort about  from Katghora tehsil, Korba district, Chhattisgarh, India, on the Korba–Bilaspur road. It is an Archaeological Survey of India protected monument. Chaiturgarh is one of the 36 forts of Chhattisgarh.

Location
It is protected by strong natural walls and is considered as one of the strongest natural forts. Since it is protected by strong natural walls, only at some places walls have been built. The fort has three main entrances which are named as Menaka, Humkara, and Simhadwar.

On the hilltop there is a plain area of about  where there are five ponds. Three of these ponds have water all around the year. Many types of wild animals and birds are found here.

Architecture
The Mahishasur Mardini temple is situated here. The idol of Mahishasur Mardini having 12 hands is installed in the sanctum sanctorum. One can go inside the cave only by creeping since it is very small in diameter.

History

 Archeologists consider it as one of the strongest natural forts. A Descriptive List of Inscriptions in the Central Province and Berar – dated in Kalchuri Era 933 (1181-82 CE) gives a long genealogical list of the Kalchuri kings. It mentions that there was a king in the family of the Haihaya who has eighteen sons. One of them was Kalinga whose son Kamala ruled over Tummana. Kamala was succeeded by Ratnaraja I and later by Prithvideva I. Mughal emperor Akbar captured the fort in 1571 and Mughals ruled until 1628 CE. Chaiturgarh was constructed by Raja Prithvideva I.

References

Forts in Chhattisgarh
Korba district
10th-century establishments in India
Korba, Chhattisgarh
10th-century fortifications